Akie Hanai is a Japanese freestyle wrestler. She won the silver medal in the women's 59 kg event at the 2021 World Wrestling Championships in Oslo, Norway.

References

External links 
 

Living people
Japanese female sport wrestlers
World Wrestling Championships medalists
Year of birth missing (living people)
21st-century Japanese women